Hugh Steel Hersman (July 8, 1872 – March 7, 1954) was an American banker, businessman, and politician who served 3 terms as a U.S. Representative from California from 1915 to 1921.

Biography 
Born in Port Deposit, Maryland, Hersman moved to California with his parents, who settled in Berkeley in 1881. He attended the public schools in California. He was graduated from the Southwestern Presbyterian University, Tennessee, in 1893. He studied at the University of California at Berkeley in 1897 and 1898.

He served as president of the First National Bank, Gilroy, California, from 1914 to 1918, and served as officer and director of various corporations.

Congress 
Hersman was elected as a Democrat to the Sixty-sixth Congress (March 4, 1919 – March 3, 1921).
He was an unsuccessful for reelection in 1920 to the Sixty-seventh Congress, losing the election to Republican Arthur M. Free.

Later career and death 
He served as member of the board of directors of the American Trust Co., Gilroy, California.
He died in San Francisco, California, March 7, 1954.
He was interred in Nottingham Cemetery, Colora, Maryland.

References

1872 births
1954 deaths
Democratic Party members of the United States House of Representatives from California
People from Gilroy, California
People from Port Deposit, Maryland
University of California, Berkeley alumni
Rhodes College alumni